Brian Kent is an American musical artist.

Musical career
From his album Breathe Life, Kent’s single “Whatcha Doin’ To Me” entered the Billboard Dance Chart, peaking at #35 in 2009 with nine weeks on the chart. It also reached #1 on Sirius Satellite Radio’s Hot 20 Chart. His next single was “I’ll Find A Way”, which was subsequently nominated for the 2010 Out Music Single of The Year and Out Music Producer Of The Year. His music video for the single “I’m Not Crazy” was on the Logo TV top ten music video list for fifteen weeks. Kent was featured on Logo network's reality series, The A-List: New York, where Mike Ruiz shot and filmed his music video for Su-Su-Su-Superstar. He is also a nightclub promoter, as former co-owner and managing partner of San Francisco nightclub Beatbox.

Discography
"Don't Stop Believin'" (2005)
"I'm Not Crazy" (2005)
"Breathe Life" (2007)
"Breathe Life - The Remixes" (2007)
"Whatcha Doin'To Me" (2009)
"I'll Find A Way" (2010)
"Su-Su-Su-Superstar" (2011)
"With or Without You (Wayne G feat Brian Kent)" (2013)
"On Every Page" (2014)
"Just Say Yes (Toy Armada & DJ Grind feat Brian Kent)" (2019)
"Proud" (2020)

Awards and nominations

References

Living people
21st-century American male singers
Gay singers
Gay songwriters
American dance musicians
American gay musicians
American LGBT singers
American LGBT songwriters
1969 births
20th-century LGBT people
21st-century LGBT people